Teresita Natvidad Collado Ramos (born 20 November 1971 in Chinique, El Quiché) is a retired Guatemalan athlete specialising in the race walking. She represented her country at the 2000 and 2004 Summer Olympics.

Competition record

Personal bests
10,000 metres walk – 46:46.12 (Bergen 2000) NR
10 kilometres walk – 45:07 (Eisenhüttenstadt 1999)
20,000 metres walk – 1:41:56.0 (Guatemala City 2002) NR
20 kilometres walk – 1:35:06 (Eisenhüttenstadt 2002)

References

1971 births
Living people
Guatemalan female racewalkers
Athletes (track and field) at the 2000 Summer Olympics
Athletes (track and field) at the 2004 Summer Olympics
Olympic athletes of Guatemala
Athletes (track and field) at the 1999 Pan American Games
Athletes (track and field) at the 2003 Pan American Games
Pan American Games competitors for Guatemala
Central American Games gold medalists for Guatemala
Central American Games medalists in athletics
Central American and Caribbean Games bronze medalists for Guatemala
Competitors at the 2002 Central American and Caribbean Games
Central American and Caribbean Games medalists in athletics